Ulloa is a district of the Heredia canton, in the Heredia province of Costa Rica.

Geography 
Ulloa has an area of  km² and an elevation of  metres.

Demographics 

For the 2011 census, Ulloa had a population of  inhabitants.

Transportation

Road transportation 
The district is covered by the following road routes:
 National Route 1
 National Route 3
 National Route 103
 National Route 106
 National Route 111
 National Route 171

References 

Districts of Heredia Province
Populated places in Heredia Province